Soveyseh Rural District is a rural district (dehestan) in Soveyseh District, Karun County, Khuzestan Province, Iran. The 2006 census reported that it had a population of 7,225, distributed between 1,286 families.  The rural district has 15 villages.

References 

Rural Districts of Khuzestan Province
Karun County